The Echo is a daily newspaper which serves South Essex, England.  It used to be part of the Westminster Press owned by Pearson, and is now owned by Newsquest.

The paper was founded in September 1969, based in Basildon. Originally, it was known as the "Evening Echo".

See also
 History of British newspapers

References

External links

 

Borough of Basildon
Newspapers published in Essex
Daily newspapers published in the United Kingdom